Brachmia cenchritis is a moth in the family Gelechiidae. It was described by Edward Meyrick in 1911. It is found in Assam, India.

The wingspan is about 16 mm. The forewings are ochreous whitish, irregularly strewn with ochreous or brownish scales with black tips. The stigmata is represented by spots formed of accumulations of similar scales, the first discal round, the second large, roundish and the plical elongate, somewhat before the first discal. There are four small spots of similar scales on the posterior half of the costa, and a suffused streak close before the termen. The hindwings are ochreous whitish, somewhat sprinkled with grey, especially towards the apex.

References

Moths described in 1911
Brachmia
Taxa named by Edward Meyrick
Moths of Asia